Seven applicant cities presented bids to host the 2014 Winter Olympics and Paralympics (formally known as XXII Olympic Winter Games and XI Paralympic Winter Games) to the International Olympic Committee (IOC). The IOC Executive Board shortlisted three cities—Sochi, Russia; Salzburg, Austria; and Pyeongchang, South Korea—with Sochi winning the IOC's July 2007 final vote.

The three selected candidates, which were chosen on 22 June 2006, delivered to the IOC their Candidature Files (known as bid books) on 10 January 2007. From February to April 2007, an ad hoc committee performed visits to the candidate cities and prepared an evaluation report which was released one month before the election.

The election by exhaustive ballot took place on 4 July 2007 in Guatemala City during the 119th IOC Session; Sochi beat out Pyeongchang by four votes in the second round of voting to win the rights to host after Salzburg had been eliminated in the first round. Pyeongchang could later awarded the 2018 Winter Olympics in 2011, just one year before the 2012 Summer Olympics.

Candidature procedure and timeline

Phase 1: Candidature acceptance procedure 

Bidding cities had to be approved by their national Olympic committees, which have the right to choose between several cities in their respective countries. The cities had to submit their applications to the IOC by 28 July 2005. The cities were asked to complete a questionnaire, which they had to submit to the IOC by 1 February 2006. An IOC Working Group then studied their answers to help the executive board members select the cities, which became candidate cities and went through to the second phase of the process. The executive board of IOC accepted three bids on 22 June 2006.

Phase 2: Candidature procedure 

The candidate cities were invited to submit their candidature file, which is a detailed description of their Olympic plans, and to prepare for a visit by the IOC Evaluation Commission. This commission undertook a technical analysis of each candidature and produced a report, which was to be published one month before the host-city election and sent to the IOC members for study. The candidature files were submitted on 10 January 2007. The IOC Evaluation Committee visited the candidate cities in February and March 2007, and published its report on 4 June.

During the 119th IOC Session on 4 July 2007 in Guatemala City, Salzburg received 25 votes and was relegated, Pyeongchang received 36 votes, and Sochi received 34 votes in the first round of the IOC voting procedure. In the second and final round, Pyeongchang received 47 votes but Sochi received 51 votes and was therefore chosen as the host of the 2014 Olympics.

Evaluation of the applicant cities 
Each cell of the table provides a minimum and a maximum figure obtained by the applicant city on the specific criteria. These figures are to be compared to a benchmark which has been set at 6.

 Report by the IOC candidature acceptance working group to the IOC Executive Board

Candidate cities overview 

All three cities suggested hosting the Games between February 7–23, 2014. The Paralympics were held from March 7–16.

Pyeongchang 

Pyeongchang was unanimously selected over Muju by the Korean Olympic Committee in December 2004, and was the first city to submit its bid to the International Olympic Committee. The bid launched a full-scale campaign after losing the 2010 race by a mere three votes to Vancouver. The 2014 project concentrated all venues within one hour of Pyeongchang, and called for huge sums of investment into new infrastructure and sporting venues, including the new Alpensia Resort. The sporting event was touted as promoting a message of peace and harmony in the divided country.

Since 2003, the region had been selected to host the 2009 Snowboard World Championships, the 2009 Biathlon World Championships and the 2009 World Women's Curling Championship, and aimed to become the winter sports hub of Asia. Although an IOC evaluation team complimented the area on levels of public support, government support and infrastructure in February 2007, the bid was also criticized because Pyeongchang was not a popular tourist destination, the venue relied heavily on artificial snow due to a dry winter climate, most slopes were relatively short and local amenities were poorly developed. Pyeongchang was eventually chosen to host the 2018 Winter Olympics.

Salzburg 

The Austrian city was eliminated in the first round in voting during the 2010 competition. The 2014 bid was more compact than the 2010 project due to the elimination of the Kitzbühel, St. Johann and Ramsau venues. The venue for bobsled, skeleton and luge, Schönau am Königssee, was located in Germany.

Sochi 

The Russian Black Sea resort bid for the Winter Olympics for the second time after failing to make the shortlist in 2002. The primary venue for outdoor sports was the ski resort in Krasnaya Polyana, which was designed by the same company that worked on ski slopes for the 2010 Winter Olympics, and scheduled to open in 2007. Sochi would host the indoor winter sports. The high number of hotel rooms and strong public and political support from the city were expected to strengthen the bid's chances.

Note: the cities are listed in the presentation order determined by draw during the IOC Executive Board meeting of 26 October 2005.

Applicant cities overview 
The following applicant cities were approved by their National Olympic Committees and submitted their applications to the IOC but were not selected as candidates by the executive board. They all sent their respective questionnaire answers by 1 February 2006. These documents were made public in the following days.

Note: the cities are listed in the presentation order determined by draw during the IOC Executive Board meeting of 26 October 2005.

Applicant cities comparison 

*Airports not included

Note: the cities are listed in the presentation order defined by the IOC during its Executive Board of 26 October 2005.

Applicant cities venues list 
These venues are from the applicant cities' mini bid books. Note that the selected candidate cities, and in particular Sochi, changed their venues plan afterwards in the final proposal to the IOC.

Potential bids 
The following cities expressed interest in bidding but withdrew their 2014 Winter Olympics bids or decided not to bid.
  Andorra la Vella, Andorra – No backing by the Andorran Olympic Committee for 2014 bid
  Annecy, France – No backing by the French Olympic Committee after Paris lost its 2012 bid.
  Erzurum, Turkey – The National Olympic Committee of Turkey cited a lack of infrastructure. Erzurum had organized the 2011 Winter Universiade.
  Harbin, China – Investment has been poured into the 2009 Winter Universiade
  Munich, Germany – National Olympic Committee for Germany cited lack of detail and planning
  Östersund, Sweden – Lack of Swedish political support
  Quebec City, Quebec, Canada – Discussed making a bid for these games before Vancouver was chosen to hold the 2010 Olympic Winter Games
  Reno and Lake Tahoe, Nevada, United States of America – No backing by the United States Olympic Committee
  Tromsø, Norway – The Norwegian government did not guarantee money to the bid
  Zürich, Switzerland – Withdrew their bid on 14 September 2004

Votes results of the 2014 Winter Olympics and Winter Paralympics 
Four years earlier, Pyeongchang led the first ballot but was defeated in the second one, then losing to Vancouver, British Columbia. Both votes although four years apart bore a remarkable similarity.

There were two rounds of voting at the session that decided which city would host the games. In the first round, Pyeongchang received 36 votes while Sochi received 34 votes. Salzburg was eliminated with only 25 votes. In the second round of voting, Pyeongchang garnered 47 votes but Sochi received most of the votes originally cast for Salzburg and gained 51 votes, winning the bid for the 2014 Winter Olympics.

See also 
 2010 Winter Olympics bids

References

External links 
 Candidature acceptance procedure for the XXII Olympic Winter Games 2014
 
 
 
 
 
 
 Homepage of the Borjomi bid
 IOC press release about the bid process (26 October 2005)

Candidature files 
 Sochi 2014
 Salzburg 2014
 PyeongChang 2014

Mini bid books 
 Sochi 2014
 Salzburg 2014
 Jaca 2014
 Almaty 2014
 PyeongChang 2014
 Sofia 2014
 Borjomi 2014

IOC evaluation report of the applicant cities 
 Conclusions
 Full evaluation report

2014 Winter Olympics
 
Articles containing video clips
July 2007 events in North America
21st century in Guatemala City
Events in Guatemala City
2007 in Guatemala